Arthur Bamber Gascoigne  (24 January 1935 – 8 February 2022) was an English television presenter and author. He was the original quizmaster on University Challenge, which initially ran from 1962 to 1987.

Early life and education
 
Gascoigne was born in London on 24 January 1935. He was the elder son of Lieutenant-Colonel Derek Ernest Frederick Orby Gascoigne  by his marriage in 1934 to Mary ("Midi") Louisa Hermione O'Neill.

Gascoigne was  educated at Sunningdale School in Berkshire before winning scholarships to both Eton College and Magdalene College, Cambridge (1955), where he read English literature. He initially wanted to become an actor, though found it tiresome to have to play the same part for more than a week, so instead turned to writing. While at Magdalene, he initially submitted scripts to the Footlights sketch troupe, though they were never performed. However, he wrote a college review in his second year, which was seen by the producer Michael Codron. He liked it enough to put it on in the West End as a musical called Share My Lettuce, in 1957. It was performed by Maggie Smith and Kenneth Williams (with music by Keith Statham and Patrick Gowers). He then spent a year as a Commonwealth Fund scholar at Yale University (1958–59). He carried out his National Service in the Grenadier Guards, where he spent six months guarding the Queen at Buckingham Palace, before being posted to Germany. After completing his National Service, he became employed as a theatre critic, firstly for The Spectator, and then The Observer. He met his wife, Christina, at Cambridge, and they married in 1965.

Ancestry
Gascoigne's family were originally Norman, arriving in the early 13th century. Gascoigne's mother was a daughter of Captain, the Hon. Arthur O'Neill and Lady Annabel Hungerford Crewe-Milnes.

His father was the son of Brigadier-General Sir Ernest Frederick Orby Gascoigne and Laura Cicely, daughter of General Edward Henry Clive, of that family of Styche Hall, Shropshire, from which also came the soldier and administrator of India Robert Clive (Clive of India).

Gascoigne's great-grandfathers included Robert Crewe-Milnes, 1st Marquess of Crewe, and Edward O'Neill, 2nd Baron O'Neill. He was a nephew of Sir Julian Gascoigne, who was in charge of the Household Division during the coronation of Queen Elizabeth II, and of Terence O'Neill, Prime Minister of Northern Ireland (1963–1969).

Gascoigne was a direct descendant of the 18th-century Lord Mayor of London Sir Crisp Gascoyne and the Tory politicians Bamber Gascoyne (the elder) and Isaac Gascoyne. Isaac's son General Ernest Frederick Gascoyne, of Raby Hall, Liverpool (1796–1867), was his great-great-great-grandfather. The name Bamber was the surname of the Lord Mayor's wife, and was given to their son.

University Challenge
Gascoigne was the original presenter (from 1962) of the television quiz show University Challenge, based on the US series College Bowl. He held the position for 25 years, until the end of the initial run in 1987. As well as presenting the show, in its initial series he also set all the questions. His questioning manner was regarded as firm yet polite. Phrases he often used which became catchphrases include: "Your starter for ten, no conferring", "fingers on buzzers” and "I'll have to hurry you." The show was initially only set for 13 episodes, but it was such a hit that Gascoigne eventually presented 913 episodes. A number of contestants later became notable in their respective careers, including Stephen Fry and Miriam Margolyes. When the show was revived in 1994 with Jeremy Paxman, Gascoigne declined to apply to present it again, as he was already involved with other projects.
 
In 1984 Gascoigne was parodied by Griff Rhys Jones in the alternative comedy series The Young Ones, in an episode entitled "Bambi". Ade Edmondson, a regular cast member of The Young Ones, later appeared on the real University Challenge. In 1998, Gascoigne presented a parody named Universe Challenge based on the sci-fi comedy series Red Dwarf.

Gascoigne was also portrayed in the 2006 comedy-drama film, Starter for 10 directed by Tom Vaughan, by the actor Mark Gatiss.

Television and books
Gascoigne was the author of Murgatreud's Empire, a 1972 satirical novel concerning an entrepreneur who finds an island of pygmies, and trades them arms for treasure, recreating the development of European medieval weaponry and armour. This was originally written as a script, although the play was abandoned because of the impossibility to find suitable performers for a cast of forty pygmies.

In 1977, Gascoigne wrote and presented The Christians, a 13-hour television documentary series on the history of Christianity, produced by Granada Television and broadcast on ITV. The same year he wrote a companion book, under the same title, with photography by his wife, Christina Gascoigne, published by Jonathan Cape. In 2003 it was revised and republished as A Brief History of Christianity by Robinson Publishing.

Gascoigne wrote Quest for the Golden Hare, a 1983 account of the internationally publicised treasure hunt associated with the publication in 1979 of Kit Williams' book Masquerade. On 8 August 1979, Gascoigne was witness to the burial by Williams of a unique jewelled, solid gold hare pendant in an earthenware jar "somewhere in Britain". The book documents the search and a scandal associated with finding it.

In 1987, Gascoigne presented a documentary series of six 30-minute programmes on Victorian history, Victorian Values, produced by Granada Television. The programmes looked at how Victorian society put in place the infrastructure of the modern welfare state.

In 1988, Gascoigne devised and presented a BBC Two arts quiz called Connoisseur, for which he also set the questions.

Gascoigne was the writer and presenter for the TV series The Great Moghuls (1990), a study of the Mughal Empire of India. The series was based on Gascoigne's 1971 book of the same name, which features photographs by his wife.

Other activities
Gascoigne established an online history encyclopaedia, HistoryWorld, based on British history. He had already published a hard copy of this encyclopaedia, though saw the internet as an opportunity to reach millions more than the book alone. He also established TimeSearch, which presents multiple searchable timelines collected from various websites.

Gascoigne was a lifelong supporter of the Liberal Party and subsequently the Liberal Democrats. He publicly endorsed the latter during their 2019 general election campaign. In August 2014, Gascoigne was one of 200 public figures who were signatories to a letter to The Guardian opposing Scottish independence in the run-up to September's referendum on that issue.

On the death of his great-aunt Mary Innes-Ker, Duchess of Roxburghe, in 2014, Gascoigne inherited an estate at West Horsley, Surrey, including West Horsley Place, a large country house dating from the 16th century. Gascoigne sold some of the late Duchess's possessions using the proceeds to restore the house, which was followed by the building of an opera house in its grounds, the Theatre in the Woods, which serves as the home base of the Grange Park Opera. An original pencil and chalk study for the painting Flaming June by Sir Frederic Leighton was found on the back of a bedroom door in the house. Art historians had known a sketch existed as it had been included in an art magazine in 1895, but did not know who owned it; it was probably bought by the Duchess's paternal grandfather after Leighton's death. Since 2019, West Horsley Place has been used as the filming location for the fictional Button House in the BBC TV comedy series Ghosts.

External interests
Gascoigne was elected in 1976 as a Fellow of the Royal Society of Literature. He was a trustee of the National Gallery, a trustee of the Tate Gallery, a member of the council of the National Trust, and a member of the board of directors of the Royal Opera House, Covent Garden. He was also a patron of the Museum of Richmond.

Personal life, honours and death
Gascoigne was married, for 57 years, to Christina (née Ditchburn), daughter of civil servant Alfred Henry Ditchburn, . He met Christina at Cambridge. They lived in Richmond, London, from the late 1960s. She is an artist working in ceramics, silks and other media. The couple did not have any children. Gascoigne was appointed Commander of the Order of the British Empire (CBE) in the 2018 Birthday Honours for services to the Arts.

In January 2022, Gascoigne was hospitalised for three weeks with pneumonia. Following his hospitalisation, Gascoigne's health drastically declined. He died at his home in Richmond on 8 February 2022, at the age of 87. Stephen Fry led the tributes to Gascoigne, saying he was "such an elegant, intelligent man". Victoria Coren Mitchell, host of BBC quiz show Only Connect, said: "No quiz host has ever seemed more like they could answer all the questions themselves."

Selected publications
 1962: Twentieth Century Drama, London: Hutchinson University Library  
 1968: Leda Had a Little Swan  (play, cancelled on the day before opening, in New York, after fourteen previews)
 1968: World Theatre: An Illustrated History, Ebury Press  
 1971: The Great Moghuls (with photographs by Christina Gascoigne), London: Jonathan Cape; New York: Harper & Row
 1973: The Treasures and Dynasties of China (with photographs by Christina Gascoigne and Derrick Witty), Jonathan Cape.   Republished 2003 as A Brief History of the Dynasties of China  
 1973: The Heyday, Jonathan Cape    (novel)
 1974: Ticker Khan: A Fable, Jonathan Cape  
1975: Castles of Great Britain (introduction; with Christina Gascoigne), Thames and Hudson,  
 1977: The Christians (with photographs by Christina Gascoigne), London: Jonathan Cape; New York: William Morrow & Co.   Revised and republished 2003 as A Brief History of Christianity, Robinson Publishing  
 1981: Why the Rope Went Tight (children's stories, with pictures by Christina Gascoigne), London: Methuen; New York: Lothrop, Lee & Shepard Books  
 1982: Fearless Freddy's Sunken Treasure (children's stories, with pictures by Christina Gascoigne), London: Methuen  
 1982: Fearless Freddy's Magic Wish (children's stories, with pictures by Christina Gascoigne), London: Methuen  
 1983: Quest for the Golden Hare, Jonathan Cape  
 1986: Cod Streuth, Jonathan Cape  
 1986: How to Identify Prints: A Complete Guide to Manual and Mechanical Processes from Woodcut to Inkjet, Thames & Hudson; revised 2nd edition 2004  
 1988: (with J Wright): Bamber Gascoigne's Book of Amazing Facts, London: Walker Books  ; 
 1993: Encyclopaedia of Britain: The A–Z of Britain's Past and Present, Macmillan Publishers  
 1997: Milestones in Colour Printing 1457–1859: With a Bibliography of Nelson Prints (The Sandars Lectures in Bibliography), Cambridge University Press  
 1998: A Brief History of the Great Moghuls: India's Most Flamboyant Rulers [revised edition of The Great Moghuls (1971)], Running Press  
 2007: Bamber Gascoigne's Challenging Quiz Book, London: Penguin Books  
 2010: A Brief History of the Second World War, HistoryWorld  
 2011: A Brief History of the First World War, HistoryWorld  , 
 2011: The Maya, Aztecs, Incas and Conquistadors: A Brief History, HistoryWorld  
 2014: The Dynasties of China: A History, The Folio Society

References

External links
 HistoryWorld website
 Timesearch website 
 Gascoigne at the Magdalene College alumni website
 
 
 

1935 births
2022 deaths
20th-century British Army personnel
20th-century English writers
21st-century English writers
Alumni of Magdalene College, Cambridge
British people of Irish descent
British theatre critics
Commanders of the Order of the British Empire
English art historians
English game show hosts
English male non-fiction writers
English musical theatre lyricists
English television presenters
Fellows of the Royal Society of Literature
People educated at Eton College
People educated at Sunningdale School
People from Richmond, London
Television personalities from London
University Challenge
Writers from London
British unionists
Liberal Democrats (UK) people